The ʿĀmirids (or Banū ʿĀmir) were the descendants and Ṣaqlabī (Slavic) clients of the house of the ḥājib ʿĀmir Muḥammad al-Manṣūr, the de facto ruler of the Umayyad caliphate of Córdoba from 976 until 1002. A series of ʿĀmirid dictators were the powers behind the caliphal throne during the long reign of Hishām II. Four ʿĀmirid dynasties were established during the period of taifas (petty kingdoms) that followed the collapse of the caliphate: Valencia, Dénia, Almería and Tortosa.

Ḥājibs

Muḥammad ibn Abi ʿĀmir al-Manṣūr: 981–1002
ʿAbd al-Malik al-Muẓaffar, son of prec.: 1002–1008
ʿAbd al-Raḥmān Sanchuelo, brother of prec.: 1008–1009

Ṣaqlabī dynasties

Valencia

 Mubārak and Muẓaffar: 1010/11–1017/18
 to Tortosa: 1017/18–1020/21
 ʿAbd al-ʿAzīz ibn ʿAbd al-Raḥmān ibn Abī ʿĀmir al-Manṣūr, son of Sanchuelo: 1020/21–1060
 ʿAbd al-Malik ibn ʿAbd al-ʿAzīz Niẓām al-Dawla al-Muẓaffar, son of prec.: 1060–1065
 to the Dhuʾl-Nūnids: 1065–1075
 Abū Bakr ibn ʿAbd al-ʿAzīz al-Manṣūr, brother of prec.: 1075–1085
 ʿUthmān ibn Abī Bakr al-Qāḍī, son of prec.: 1085
 to the Dhuʾl-Nūnids

Dénia
Mujāhid was a member of Muḥammad ibn Abi ʿĀmir's household.

 Mujāhid ibn ʿAbd Allāh al-ʿĀmiri al-Muwaffaq: c.1012–1045
 ʿAlī ibn Mujāhid Iqbāl al-Dawla: 1045–1076
 to the Hūdids

Almería

 Khayrān al-Ṣaqlabī: c.1013–1028
 Zuhayr al-Ṣaqlabī: 1028–1038
 to Valencia: 1038–1042
 to the Banū Ṣumādiḥ

Tortosa

 Labīb al-Ṣaqlabī: 1021–1036
 Muqātil al-Ṣaqlabī: 1036–c.1046
 Nabil: c.1046–c.1060
 to the Hūdids

Notes

Sources

Arab dynasties
Dynasties in al-Andalus
Taifa of Valencia